"Change in Mood" is the debut single from Australian pop/new wave group Kids in the Kitchen. The song was released in October 1983 as the lead single from their debut studio album, Shine (1985). The song peaked at number 10 on the Australian Kent Music Report.

At the 1983 Countdown Music Awards, the song was nominated for Best Debut Single.

Track listing 
7" (K9220) 
Side A "Change in Mood" - 3:44
Side B "Far from Where"

Charts

Weekly charts

Year-end charts

References 

1983 songs
1983 debut singles
Kids in the Kitchen songs
Mushroom Records singles